The 1932 Hamilton municipal election was held on December 5, 1932 to select one Mayor, four Controllers, and sixteen members of the Hamilton, Ontario City Council, two from each of the city's eight wards. Voters also cast ballots for trustees for the public school board.

Campaign

Held during the economic depression of the 1930s, the election was marked by differences between two ideologically different groups. The Hamilton-branch of the Independent Labour Party stood on a social-democratic platform of advancing the rights of working people and trade unionists in the light of the economic situation of the time. Alternately, a number of candidates stood on a platform that advocated a classical liberal economic policy and referred to themselves as the Policy For 1933 slate. Each group ran candidates for the Board of Control and aldermen, but neither mayoral candidate identified as a member of either slate. Two Communist Party candidates stood in the traditionally working class Wards Seven and Eight in the city's north-end.

The city's Home Owners' Association endorsed candidates based on their policies and opposition to a council-manager system of municipal government. As a group of property owners, the association endorsed right-leaning candidates of whom a majority were also affiliated with the Policy for 1933 group.

The election was notable for the loss of five incumbent aldermen. Four of the aldermen were independents, three of whom were defeated by Policy for 1933 candidates. One Policy for 1933 alderman was defeated by an Independent Labour Party candidate in Ward Eight, the only instance of the party defeating a sitting right-wing alderman.

Mayor

|-
!rowspan="2" colspan="2"|Candidate
!rowspan="2" colspan="1"|Affiliation
!colspan="3"|Popular vote
|-
! Votes
! %
! ±%
|-
| style="background-color:#FA8072;" |
| style="text-align:left;" | John Peebles (incumbent)
| style="text-align:left;" | Independent
| style="text-align:right;" |24,499
| style="text-align:right;" |57.32%
| style="text-align:right;" |-17.54%
|-
| style="background-color:#89CFF0;" |
| style="text-align:left;" | John Bell
| style="text-align:left;" | Independent
| style="text-align:right;" |18,238
| style="text-align:right;" |42.68%
| style="text-align:right;" |n/a
|-
| style="text-align:right;background-color:#FFFFFF;" colspan="3" |Total votes
| style="text-align:right;background-color:#FFFFFF;" |42,737
| style="text-align:right;background-color:#FFFFFF;" |100%
| style="text-align:right;background-color:#FFFFFF;" |
|-
| style="text-align:right;background-color:#FFFFFF;" colspan="3" |Registered voters
| style="text-align:right;background-color:#FFFFFF;" |n/a
| style="text-align:right;background-color:#FFFFFF;" |n/a
| style="text-align:right;background-color:#FFFFFF;" |n/a
|-
| style="text-align:left;" colspan="6" |Note: Candidate campaign colours are used as a visual differentiation between candidates and to indicate affiliation.
|-
| style="text-align:left;" colspan="13" |Sources: "Peebles Re-Elected By Large Majority", Hamilton Spectator, Tuesday, December 6, 1932, pp. 7.
|}

Board of Control

|-
!rowspan="2" colspan="2"|Candidate
!rowspan="2" colspan="1"|Affiliation
!colspan="3"|Popular vote
|-
! Votes
! %
! ±%
|-
| style="background-color:#B0E0E6;" |
| style="text-align:left;" | Freeman Treleaven
| style="text-align:left;" | Policy for 1933
| style="text-align:right;" |23,309
| style="text-align:right;" |n/a
| style="text-align:right;" |n/a
|-
| style="background-color:#FADA5E;" |
| style="text-align:left;" | Sam Lawrence (incumbent)
| style="text-align:left;" | Independent Labour Party
| style="text-align:right;" |21,323
| style="text-align:right;" |n/a
| style="text-align:right;" |n/a
|-
| style="background-color:#B0E0E6;" |
| style="text-align:left;" | Donald MacFarlane (incumbent)
| style="text-align:left;" | Policy for 1933
| style="text-align:right;" |19,816
| style="text-align:right;" |n/a
| style="text-align:right;" |n/a
|-
| style="background-color:#B0E0E6;" |
| style="text-align:left;" | Septimus DuMoulin
| style="text-align:left;" | Policy for 1933
| style="text-align:right;" |18,308
| style="text-align:right;" |n/a
| style="text-align:right;" |n/a
|-

| style="text-align:left;" | Cranmer Riselay
| style="text-align:left;" | Independent
| style="text-align:right;" |14,433
| style="text-align:right;" |n/a
| style="text-align:right;" |n/a
|-

| style="text-align:left;" | Samuel Weaver
| style="text-align:left;" | Independent
| style="text-align:right;" |8,243
| style="text-align:right;" |n/a
| style="text-align:right;" |n/a
|-

| style="text-align:left;" | Alexander McLennan
| style="text-align:left;" | Independent
| style="text-align:right;" |5,527
| style="text-align:right;" |n/a
| style="text-align:right;" |n/a
|-

| style="text-align:left;" | Thomas Morris
| style="text-align:left;" | Independent
| style="text-align:right;" |4,729
| style="text-align:right;" |n/a
| style="text-align:right;" |n/a
|-
| style="text-align:right;background-color:#FFFFFF;" colspan="3" |Total votes
| style="text-align:right;background-color:#FFFFFF;" |n/a
| style="text-align:right;background-color:#FFFFFF;" |n/a
| style="text-align:right;background-color:#FFFFFF;" |
|-
| style="text-align:right;background-color:#FFFFFF;" colspan="3" |Registered voters
| style="text-align:right;background-color:#FFFFFF;" |n/a
| style="text-align:right;background-color:#FFFFFF;" |n/a
| style="text-align:right;background-color:#FFFFFF;" |n/a
|-
| style="text-align:left;" colspan="6" |Note: Candidate campaign colours are used as a visual differentiation between candidates and to indicate affiliation.
|-
| style="text-align:left;" colspan="13" |Sources: "Board of Control Summary", Hamilton Spectator, Tuesday, December 6, 1932, pp. 16.
|}

Aldermen

Ward One

|-
!rowspan="2" colspan="2"|Candidate
!rowspan="2" colspan="1"|Affiliation
!colspan="3"|Popular vote
|-
! Votes
! %
! ±%
|-
| style="background-color:#B0E0E6;" |
| style="text-align:left;" | Andy Gaul (incumbent)
| style="text-align:left;" | Policy for 1933
| style="text-align:right;" |3,469
| style="text-align:right;" |n/a
| style="text-align:right;" |n/a
|-

| style="text-align:left;" | Nora Frances Henderson (incumbent)
| style="text-align:left;" | Independent
| style="text-align:right;" |3,448
| style="text-align:right;" |n/a
| style="text-align:right;" |n/a
|-

| style="text-align:left;" | William MacFarland
| style="text-align:left;" | Independent
| style="text-align:right;" |3,275
| style="text-align:right;" |n/a
| style="text-align:right;" |n/a
|-

| style="text-align:left;" | Herbert Wilton
| style="text-align:left;" | Independent
| style="text-align:right;" |1,789
| style="text-align:right;" |n/a
| style="text-align:right;" |n/a
|-
| style="text-align:right;background-color:#FFFFFF;" colspan="3" |Total votes
| style="text-align:right;background-color:#FFFFFF;" |n/a
| style="text-align:right;background-color:#FFFFFF;" |n/a
| style="text-align:right;background-color:#FFFFFF;" |
|-
| style="text-align:right;background-color:#FFFFFF;" colspan="3" |Registered voters
| style="text-align:right;background-color:#FFFFFF;" |n/a
| style="text-align:right;background-color:#FFFFFF;" |n/a
| style="text-align:right;background-color:#FFFFFF;" |n/a
|-
| style="text-align:left;" colspan="6" |Note: Candidate campaign colours are used as a visual differentiation between candidates and to indicate affiliation.
|-
| style="text-align:left;" colspan="13" |Sources: "How Aldermanic Candidates Ran," Hamilton Spectator, Tuesday, December 6, 1932, pp. 16.
|}

Ward Two

|-
!rowspan="2" colspan="2"|Candidate
!rowspan="2" colspan="1"|Affiliation
!colspan="3"|Popular vote
|-
! Votes
! %
! ±%
|-

| style="text-align:left;" | William Ainsley (incumbent)
| style="text-align:left;" | Independent Liberal
| style="text-align:right;" |2,365
| style="text-align:right;" |n/a
| style="text-align:right;" |n/a
|-
| style="background-color:#B0E0E6;" |
| style="text-align:left;" | Thomas Gallagher
| style="text-align:left;" | Policy for 1933
| style="text-align:right;" |1,576
| style="text-align:right;" |n/a
| style="text-align:right;" |n/a
|-

| style="text-align:left;" | Gordon Flett
| style="text-align:left;" | Independent
| style="text-align:right;" |1,265
| style="text-align:right;" |n/a
| style="text-align:right;" |n/a
|-

| style="text-align:left;" | William McClemont
| style="text-align:left;" | Independent
| style="text-align:right;" |1,262
| style="text-align:right;" |n/a
| style="text-align:right;" |n/a
|-

| style="text-align:left;" | John Halcrow
| style="text-align:left;" | Independent Labour Party
| style="text-align:right;" |1,234
| style="text-align:right;" |n/a
| style="text-align:right;" |n/a
|-
| style="text-align:right;background-color:#FFFFFF;" colspan="3" |Total votes
| style="text-align:right;background-color:#FFFFFF;" |n/a
| style="text-align:right;background-color:#FFFFFF;" |n/a
| style="text-align:right;background-color:#FFFFFF;" |
|-
| style="text-align:right;background-color:#FFFFFF;" colspan="3" |Registered voters
| style="text-align:right;background-color:#FFFFFF;" |n/a
| style="text-align:right;background-color:#FFFFFF;" |n/a
| style="text-align:right;background-color:#FFFFFF;" |n/a
|-
| style="text-align:left;" colspan="6" |Note: Candidate campaign colours are used as a visual differentiation between candidates and to indicate affiliation.
|-
| style="text-align:left;" colspan="13" |Sources: "How Aldermanic Candidates Ran," Hamilton Spectator, Tuesday, December 6, 1932, pp. 16.
|}

Ward Three

|-
!rowspan="2" colspan="2"|Candidate
!rowspan="2" colspan="1"|Affiliation
!colspan="3"|Popular vote
|-
! Votes
! %
! ±%
|-
| style="background-color:#B0E0E6;" |
| style="text-align:left;" | William Fick
| style="text-align:left;" | Policy for 1933
| style="text-align:right;" |2,643
| style="text-align:right;" |n/a
| style="text-align:right;" |n/a
|-
| style="background-color:#B0E0E6;" |
| style="text-align:left;" | Robert Evans
| style="text-align:left;" | Policy for 1933
| style="text-align:right;" |2,611
| style="text-align:right;" |n/a
| style="text-align:right;" |n/a
|-

| style="text-align:left;" | William Hutton (incumbent)
| style="text-align:left;" | Independent
| style="text-align:right;" |1,649
| style="text-align:right;" |n/a
| style="text-align:right;" |n/a
|-

| style="text-align:left;" | Austin Macaulay (incumbent)
| style="text-align:left;" | Independent
| style="text-align:right;" |1,568
| style="text-align:right;" |n/a
| style="text-align:right;" |n/a
|-
| style="background-color:#FADA5E;" |
| style="text-align:left;" | Edward Bryan
| style="text-align:left;" | Independent Labour Party
| style="text-align:right;" |956
| style="text-align:right;" |n/a
| style="text-align:right;" |n/a
|-
| style="text-align:right;background-color:#FFFFFF;" colspan="3" |Total votes
| style="text-align:right;background-color:#FFFFFF;" |n/a
| style="text-align:right;background-color:#FFFFFF;" |n/a
| style="text-align:right;background-color:#FFFFFF;" |
|-
| style="text-align:right;background-color:#FFFFFF;" colspan="3" |Registered voters
| style="text-align:right;background-color:#FFFFFF;" |n/a
| style="text-align:right;background-color:#FFFFFF;" |n/a
| style="text-align:right;background-color:#FFFFFF;" |n/a
|-
| style="text-align:left;" colspan="6" |Note: Candidate campaign colours are used as a visual differentiation between candidates and to indicate affiliation.
|-
| style="text-align:left;" colspan="13" |Sources: "How Aldermanic Candidates Ran", Hamilton Spectator, Tuesday, December 6, 1932, pp. 16.
|}

Ward Four

|-
!rowspan="2" colspan="2"|Candidate
!rowspan="2" colspan="1"|Affiliation
!colspan="3"|Popular vote
|-
! Votes
! %
! ±%
|-
| style="background-color:#B0E0E6;" |
| style="text-align:left;" | George Hancock (incumbent)
| style="text-align:left;" | Policy for 1933
| style="text-align:right;" |2,103
| style="text-align:right;" |n/a
| style="text-align:right;" |n/a
|-
| style="background-color:#B0E0E6;" |
| style="text-align:left;" | Arthur Davidson (incumbent)
| style="text-align:left;" | Policy for 1933
| style="text-align:right;" |1,893
| style="text-align:right;" |n/a
| style="text-align:right;" |n/a
|-

| style="text-align:left;" | Thomas O'Heir
| style="text-align:left;" | Independent
| style="text-align:right;" |1,242
| style="text-align:right;" |n/a
| style="text-align:right;" |n/a
|-
| style="background-color:#FADA5E;" |
| style="text-align:left;" | Henry Eickhoff
| style="text-align:left;" | Independent Labour Party
| style="text-align:right;" |1,101
| style="text-align:right;" |n/a
| style="text-align:right;" |n/a
|-

| style="text-align:left;" | John Brewer
| style="text-align:left;" | Independent
| style="text-align:right;" |281
| style="text-align:right;" |n/a
| style="text-align:right;" |n/a
|-
| style="text-align:right;background-color:#FFFFFF;" colspan="3" |Total votes
| style="text-align:right;background-color:#FFFFFF;" |n/a
| style="text-align:right;background-color:#FFFFFF;" |n/a
| style="text-align:right;background-color:#FFFFFF;" |
|-
| style="text-align:right;background-color:#FFFFFF;" colspan="3" |Registered voters
| style="text-align:right;background-color:#FFFFFF;" |n/a
| style="text-align:right;background-color:#FFFFFF;" |n/a
| style="text-align:right;background-color:#FFFFFF;" |n/a
|-
| style="text-align:left;" colspan="6" |Note: Candidate campaign colours are used as a visual differentiation between candidates and to indicate affiliation.
|-
| style="text-align:left;" colspan="13" |Sources: "How Aldermanic Candidates Ran", Hamilton Spectator, Tuesday, December 6, 1932, pp. 16.
|}

Ward Five

|-
!rowspan="2" colspan="2"|Candidate
!rowspan="2" colspan="1"|Affiliation
!colspan="3"|Popular vote
|-
! Votes
! %
! ±%
|-
| style="background-color:#B0E0E6;" |
| style="text-align:left;" | Thomas White
| style="text-align:left;" | Policy for 1933
| style="text-align:right;" |1,868
| style="text-align:right;" |n/a
| style="text-align:right;" |n/a
|-
| style="background-color:#FADA5E;" |
| style="text-align:left;" | Charles Aitchison (incumbent)
| style="text-align:left;" | Independent Labour Party
| style="text-align:right;" |1,558
| style="text-align:right;" |n/a
| style="text-align:right;" |n/a
|-

| style="text-align:left;" | Alexander Nelligan
| style="text-align:left;" | Independent
| style="text-align:right;" |1,184
| style="text-align:right;" |n/a
| style="text-align:right;" |n/a
|-

| style="text-align:left;" | John Sherring (incumbent)
| style="text-align:left;" | Independent
| style="text-align:right;" |906
| style="text-align:right;" |n/a
| style="text-align:right;" |n/a
|-

| style="text-align:left;" | Pierce Somerville
| style="text-align:left;" | Independent
| style="text-align:right;" |621
| style="text-align:right;" |n/a
| style="text-align:right;" |n/a
|-

| style="text-align:left;" | David Atkins
| style="text-align:left;" | Independent
| style="text-align:right;" |504
| style="text-align:right;" |n/a
| style="text-align:right;" |n/a
|-
| style="background-color:#FADA5E;" |
| style="text-align:left;" | Christopher Hennessy
| style="text-align:left;" | Independent Labour Party
| style="text-align:right;" |419
| style="text-align:right;" |n/a
| style="text-align:right;" |n/a
|-

| style="text-align:left;" | Thomas Allison
| style="text-align:left;" | Independent
| style="text-align:right;" |347
| style="text-align:right;" |n/a
| style="text-align:right;" |n/a
|-

| style="text-align:left;" | Michael Cummings
| style="text-align:left;" | Independent
| style="text-align:right;" |251
| style="text-align:right;" |n/a
| style="text-align:right;" |n/a
|-

| style="text-align:left;" | Michael Licata
| style="text-align:left;" | Independent
| style="text-align:right;" |241
| style="text-align:right;" |n/a
| style="text-align:right;" |n/a
|-
| style="text-align:right;background-color:#FFFFFF;" colspan="3" |Total votes
| style="text-align:right;background-color:#FFFFFF;" |n/a
| style="text-align:right;background-color:#FFFFFF;" |n/a
| style="text-align:right;background-color:#FFFFFF;" |
|-
| style="text-align:right;background-color:#FFFFFF;" colspan="3" |Registered voters
| style="text-align:right;background-color:#FFFFFF;" |n/a
| style="text-align:right;background-color:#FFFFFF;" |n/a
| style="text-align:right;background-color:#FFFFFF;" |n/a
|-
| style="text-align:left;" colspan="6" |Note: Candidate campaign colours are used as a visual differentiation between candidates and to indicate affiliation.
|-
| style="text-align:left;" colspan="13" |Sources: "How Aldermanic Candidates Ran", Hamilton Spectator, Tuesday, December 6, 1932, pp. 16.
|}

Ward Six

|-
!rowspan="2" colspan="2"|Candidate
!rowspan="2" colspan="1"|Affiliation
!colspan="3"|Popular vote
|-
! Votes
! %
! ±%
|-
| style="background-color:#FADA5E;" |
| style="text-align:left;" | Archie Pollock (incumbent)
| style="text-align:left;" | Independent Labour Party
| style="text-align:right;" |2,656
| style="text-align:right;" |n/a
| style="text-align:right;" |n/a
|-

| style="text-align:left;" | Andy Frame (incumbent)
| style="text-align:left;" | Independent
| style="text-align:right;" |2,531
| style="text-align:right;" |n/a
| style="text-align:right;" |n/a
|-

| style="text-align:left;" | John Hodgson
| style="text-align:left;" | Independent
| style="text-align:right;" |2,338
| style="text-align:right;" |n/a
| style="text-align:right;" |n/a
|-

| style="text-align:left;" | Herbert Wise
| style="text-align:left;" | Independent
| style="text-align:right;" |1,283
| style="text-align:right;" |n/a
| style="text-align:right;" |n/a
|-
| style="background-color:#FADA5E;" |
| style="text-align:left;" | Wilfred Bircher
| style="text-align:left;" | Independent Labour Party
| style="text-align:right;" |662
| style="text-align:right;" |n/a
| style="text-align:right;" |n/a
|-

| style="text-align:left;" | Michael Hutchison
| style="text-align:left;" | Independent
| style="text-align:right;" |470
| style="text-align:right;" |n/a
| style="text-align:right;" |n/a
|-

| style="text-align:left;" | Edward Fernside
| style="text-align:left;" | Independent
| style="text-align:right;" |422
| style="text-align:right;" |n/a
| style="text-align:right;" |n/a
|-
| style="text-align:right;background-color:#FFFFFF;" colspan="3" |Total votes
| style="text-align:right;background-color:#FFFFFF;" |n/a
| style="text-align:right;background-color:#FFFFFF;" |n/a
| style="text-align:right;background-color:#FFFFFF;" |
|-
| style="text-align:right;background-color:#FFFFFF;" colspan="3" |Registered voters
| style="text-align:right;background-color:#FFFFFF;" |n/a
| style="text-align:right;background-color:#FFFFFF;" |n/a
| style="text-align:right;background-color:#FFFFFF;" |n/a
|-
| style="text-align:left;" colspan="6" |Note: Candidate campaign colours are used as a visual differentiation between candidates and to indicate affiliation.
|-
| style="text-align:left;" colspan="13" |Sources: "How Aldermanic Candidates Ran", Hamilton Spectator, Tuesday, December 6, 1932, pp. 16.
|}

Ward Seven

|-
!colspan="2"|Affiliation
! Candidate
! Votes
! Elected

|- 
| style="text-align:left;" colspan="6" |Note: Candidate campaign colours are used as a visual differentiation between candidates and to indicate affiliation.
|- 
| style="text-align:left;" colspan="13" |Sources: "How Aldermanic Candidates Ran", Hamilton Spectator, Tuesday, December 6, 1932, pp. 16.
|}

Ward Eight

|-
!rowspan="2" colspan="2"|Candidate
!rowspan="2" colspan="1"|Affiliation
!colspan="3"|Popular vote
|-
! Votes
! %
! ±%
|-
| style="background-color:#FADA5E;" |
| style="text-align:left;" | John Mitchell (incumbent)
| style="text-align:left;" | Independent Labour Party
| style="text-align:right;" |3,331
| style="text-align:right;" |n/a
| style="text-align:right;" |n/a
|-
| style="background-color:#FADA5E;" |
| style="text-align:left;" | James Reed 
| style="text-align:left;" | Independent Labour Party
| style="text-align:right;" |2,203
| style="text-align:right;" |n/a
| style="text-align:right;" |n/a
|-
| style="background-color:#B0E0E6;" |
| style="text-align:left;" | Archie Burton (incumbent)
| style="text-align:left;" | Policy for 1933
| style="text-align:right;" |2,089
| style="text-align:right;" |n/a
| style="text-align:right;" |n/a
|-
| style="background-color:#C41E3A;" |
| style="text-align:left;" | James Walker
| style="text-align:left;" | Communist Party
| style="text-align:right;" |1,288
| style="text-align:right;" |n/a
| style="text-align:right;" |n/a
|-

| style="text-align:left;" | Nathaniel Moore
| style="text-align:left;" | Independent
| style="text-align:right;" |853
| style="text-align:right;" |n/a
| style="text-align:right;" |n/a
|-
| style="text-align:right;background-color:#FFFFFF;" colspan="3" |Total votes
| style="text-align:right;background-color:#FFFFFF;" |n/a
| style="text-align:right;background-color:#FFFFFF;" |n/a
| style="text-align:right;background-color:#FFFFFF;" |
|- 
| style="text-align:right;background-color:#FFFFFF;" colspan="3" |Registered voters
| style="text-align:right;background-color:#FFFFFF;" |n/a
| style="text-align:right;background-color:#FFFFFF;" |n/a
| style="text-align:right;background-color:#FFFFFF;" |n/a
|- 
| style="text-align:left;" colspan="6" |Note: Candidate campaign colours are used as a visual differentiation between candidates and to indicate affiliation.
|- 
| style="text-align:left;" colspan="13" |Sources: "How Aldermanic Candidates Ran", Hamilton Spectator, Tuesday, December 6, 1932, pp. 16.
|}

References

1932 Ontario municipal elections
1932